Željko Pakasin (born 8 June 1967) is a retired Croatian football midfielder and manager.

Career
Born in Hlebine near Koprivnica, Pakasin started his career at local side Slaven Belupo but made his mark with Osijek and later played for Dinamo Zagreb (called Croatia Zagreb at the time) and in Austria.

References

1967 births
Living people
People from Hlebine
Association football midfielders
Yugoslav footballers
Croatian footballers
NK Osijek players
GNK Dinamo Zagreb players
SK Sturm Graz players
NK Hrvatski Dragovoljac players
NK Slaven Belupo players
Yugoslav First League players
Croatian Football League players
Austrian Football Bundesliga players
Croatian expatriate footballers
Expatriate footballers in Austria
Croatian expatriate sportspeople in Austria
Croatian football managers
NK Lokomotiva Zagreb managers